Nwali Sylvester Ngwuta, CFR (30 March 1951 – 7 March 2021) was a Nigerian jurist and Justice of the Supreme Court of Nigeria. He served on the Supreme Court from 2011 until his death in 2021.

Early life

Justice Sylvester was born in 1951 in Amofia-Ukawu, Onicha local government area of Ebonyi State, South-Eastern Nigeria.

He obtained a bachelor's degree in Law from Obafemi Awolowo University and was called to the bar, the Nigerian bar in 1978 after he graduated from the Nigerian Law School.

Law career

Justice Sylvester began his law career in 1978 as a state counsel in Benue State ministry of justice, the same year he established his own law firm. In October 1995, he was appointed a Judge of the Abia State High Court. On 22 May 2011, he was appointed to the bench of the Nigerian courts of appeal and in May 2013, he was appointed to the bench of the Supreme Court of Nigeria as Justice.

He presided over the ruling of the Supreme Court that affirmed Olusegun Mimiko as the governor-elect of Ondo State in the May 2013 governorship election.
He also presided over the ruling of the Supreme Court that affirmed Kayode Fayemi as the governor-elect of Ekiti State in the June 2013 governorship election and was supported by Justices Ibrahim Tanko Muhammad and Suleiman Galadima. He was arrested by the Department of State Security Services (DSS) on 8 October 2016 on allegations of bribery and corruption. However, the Court of Code Tribunal (CCT) ruled in May 2018 that only the National Judicial Council could determine whether or not Ngwata would face trial. In September 2019, Ngwuta resumed his duties as a Supreme Court Justice after a three-year suspension.

Membership

Member, Nigerian Bar Association
Member, International Bar Association
Member, Nigerian Body of Benchers

See also

 List of people from Ebonyi State

References

1951 births
2021 deaths
Nigerian judges
Nigerian jurists
Obafemi Awolowo University alumni
Nigerian Law School alumni
People from Ebonyi State
Supreme Court of Nigeria justices